Ricardo Manuel Pinho Matos, known as Ricardo Matos (born 25 March 2000) is a Portuguese football player who plays as a forward for Primeira Liga club Portimonese.

Club career
On 7 August 2019, he signed a 3-year contract with Italian Serie B club Ascoli.

He made his Serie B debut for Ascoli on 18 January 2020 in a game against Trapani. He substituted Leonardo Morosini in the 83rd minute.

On 1 February 2021, he joined Serie C club Casertana on loan.

On 16 August 2021, he joined to Ascoli on permanent basis.

On January 31 2022, he joined Primeira Liga club Portimonese.

References

External links
 
 

2000 births
People from Santarém, Portugal
Living people
Portuguese footballers
Association football forwards
Ascoli Calcio 1898 F.C. players
Casertana F.C. players
S.C. Olhanense players
Portimonense S.C. players
Primeira Liga players
Serie B players
Serie C players
Portuguese expatriate footballers
Expatriate footballers in Italy
Sportspeople from Santarém District